Kiels Mountain is a rural locality in the Sunshine Coast Region, Queensland, Australia.

Geography 
The Bruce Highway defines the western boundary of the locality.

Eudlo Creek passes through the southeast tip of Kiels Mountain. Numerous creeks form on the slopes of the mountain, all of which are eventually tributaries of the Maroochy River.

The land use is principally rural residential.

History

The mountain is named after Heinrich "Henry" August Keil who selected on the eastern slopes in 1880. He was the first settler at Diddillibah, on the north side of Kiels Mountain in 1869. Henry Keil was born 13 July 1838 in Frankenberg, Hesse, Germany, the eldest son of Heinrich Andreas Keil and Anna Katherina Schwaner. He immigrated to Queesland arriving in Brisbane 28 March 1857 on 'SS Helene'. 

Henry Keil and his wife Elizabeth were prominent Salvationists during the early growth of the Salvation Army on the Sunshine Coast, and were known for their charity to the local Aborigines.

Kiel's Mountain State School opened on 23 September 1918 and closed on 15 April 1962. It was at 349-355 Diddillibah Road (north-west corner of Preston Road); it is now within the locality boundaries of Diddillibah. 

The spelling was Anglicised from Keils to Kiels Mountain c1930.

On 7 December 2003, 13-year-old Daniel Morcombe disappeared while waiting for a bus on Nambour-Connection Rd (Old Bruce Highway), near the Kiel Mountain Road overpass at Woombye. An arrest was made in August 2011 in connection with his death. His remains were discovered near the Glass House Mountains.

Spiritual retreat
Avatar's Abode is a  spiritual retreat dedicated to Meher Baba (1894–1969) who stayed there in 1958. Avatar's Abode is the oldest and longest-running eastern retreat in Queensland. It is at 48 Meher Road at the summit of Kiels Mountain.

Education 
There are no schools in Kiels Mountain. The nearest primary schools are in Woombye and Kuluin. The nearest secondary schools are in Nambour and Maroochydore.

Amenities 
There are a number of parks in the locality, including:
 Brookfield Court Bushland Conservation Reserve

 Bushbird Court Bushland Conservation Reserve

 Glenfinnan Bushland Conservation Reserve

 Kaalba Court Natural Amenity Reserve

 Kentish Road Reserve

 Kiel Mountain Bushland Conservation Reserve

 Merimist Way Bushland Conservation Reserve

References

Further reading

External links
 

Suburbs of the Sunshine Coast Region
Localities in Queensland